Kosan may be:
 Kosan County, a county in Kangwon Province, North Korea
 Kosan Biosciences, American pharmaceuticals company
 Ube Kosan Open, golf tournament played at the Ube 72 Country Club, Yamaguchi, Japan

People with the surname Kosan include:
 Anja Kosan (born 2002), German rhythmic gymnast
 Daniela Kosán, Venezuelan model

See also
 Ko San, South Korean cosmonaut

ko:고산